Timothy P. Kearney (born November 22, 1960) is an American politician and architect. He is a Democratic member of the Pennsylvania State Senate, representing the 26th District since 2019.

Education and career

Kearney received a B.S. from the Catholic University of America and a M.Arch. from the University of Pennsylvania. He is an adjunct professor at Drexel University. He is also a partner in an architectural firm, along with his wife.

Political career

Kearney served seven years on the planning commission for Swarthmore, Pennsylvania before being elected to two terms as mayor. In total, he served the borough for 12 years, focusing on environmental and social issues, including working towards making the borough more pedestrian-friendly.

In 2018, he defeated Republican Tom McGarrigle in an upset to become state senator and the first Democrat to represent the 26th district since 1978.

Committee assignments 
Kearney sits on the following committees in the Senate:

Local Government Committee (Minority Chair)
Appropriations Committee
Education Committee
Labor & Industry Committee
Transportation Committee

References

External links
Official page at the Pennsylvania General Assembly
Campaign site
 

Living people
Democratic Party Pennsylvania state senators
21st-century American politicians
Architects from Philadelphia
1960 births
Mayors of places in Pennsylvania